Marutha Nattu Veeran is a 1961 Indian Tamil-language swashbuckler film, directed by T. R. Raghunath and produced by B. Radhakrishna. The film stars Sivaji Ganesan, Jamuna, P. S. Veerappa and P. Kannamba. It was released on 24 August 1961.

Plot 

Jeevagan, a brave young man is appointed as the high guard to protect princess Ratna and soon they both fall in love. Meanwhile, the King's minister, Veera Kesha is secretly plotting with the Sultan, a known enemy of the throne. Veera Kesha frames Jeevagan as a traitor and turns the Kingdom against him. What sinister plan does the Sultan hold? Can Jeevagan prove his innocence and save his Kingdom?

Cast 

Sivaji Ganesan as General Jeevagan
Jamuna as Princess Rathna
P. S. Veerappa as Royal body guard Veerakesari
P. Kannamba as Jeevagan's mother
Sriram as Prince Parthiban, he is prince of Pavala Kingdom and his uncle of Princess Rathna
A. Karunanidhi as Blacksmith/Jeevagan's friend
A. Rama Rao as Price Dhariyanathan, Rathna's half-brother
K. Natarajan as Maruthanattu King
M. R. Santhanam
P. S. Venkatachalam as Sultan Aladdin
K. R. Ramsingh
Nandha Ram
K. Kannan as Veerakesari's henchmen
Ganapathy Bhat
N. R. Sandhya as Queen Alangari
M. Saroja as Kanmani, Princess Rathna's friend
K. V. Shanthi
Jyothi

Soundtrack 
The music was composed by S. V. Venkatraman. Lyrics were penned by Kannadasan and A. Maruthakasi.

Reception 
The Indian Express praised the film for the performances of Ganesan, Kannamba, Jamuna and Veerappa, and the lyrics by Kannadasan and Maruthakasi. Kanthan of Kalki negatively reviewed the film, and hoped it would put an end to Tamil films based on monarchs.

References

External links 
 

1960s historical adventure films
1960s historical drama films
1960s Tamil-language films
1961 films
Films about royalty
Films directed by T. R. Raghunath
Films scored by S. V. Venkatraman
Indian black-and-white films
Indian historical adventure films
Indian historical drama films
Indian swashbuckler films